Terrence G. Wiley has served as Chief Executive Officer of the Center for Applied Linguistics (CAL) in Washington, DC (2010-2017), Professor Emeritus of Educational Policy Studies and Applied Linguistics at Arizona State University, and member of the College of Education, Graduate Faculty at the University of Maryland.

Biography 

Wiley received his PhD in Education from the University of Southern California.  He holds master's degrees in Linguistics and Asian Studies and a bachelor's degree in History from California State University, Long Beach.
He served as Executive Dean of the Mary Lou Fulton Institute and Graduate School of Education and Director of the Division of Educational Leadership and Policy at ASU prior to becoming president of  CAL.

Career 

Wiley is the author/co-editor of 10 books and over 100 juried articles and book chapters. His work has focused on literacy and language diversity, Ebonics, bilingual education, heritage and community language education, history of language policy and politics, and the impacts of globalization and restrictive language policies. He has served as a visiting scholar at universities in China, Japan, India, South Africa, Chile, Israel, the United Kingdom, and in the US. He is the co-founder of two scholarly journals, Journal of Language, Identity, and Education and International Multilingual Research Journal. His recent books include Handbook on Heritage, Community, and Native American Language Education in the United States: Research, Policy and Practice. Wiley has received a number of awards for scholarship, service, teaching, and mentoring, including:

 Distinguished Scholarship and Service Award, American Association for Applied Linguistics (AAAL) (2014).
 Honorary Member, ACTFL Discover Language Committee (2013-2014).
 Circle of Excellence Award for Outstanding Contributions to Education, Arizona Asian American Association (AAAA), Arizona (2008).  
 ASU President's Medal for Social Embeddedness, co-recipient, Arizona State University (2005).
 Dean's Excellence Award for Teaching, College of Education, ASU (2004)
 Outstanding Faculty Award, College of Extended Education, Arizona State University (2003).
 Outstanding Mentoring Award, Graduate Interdisciplinary Studies Program, CSULB (1999).
 Distinguished Faculty Scholarly and Creative Achievement Award, CSULB (1996). 
 Multicultural Scholarship Award, Center for Multicultural Education, CSULB (1992).
 Outstanding Dissertation Award, "First Place." National Association for Bilingual Education (1991).

Selected works 
 Wiley, T.G., Christian, D., Peyton, J., Moore, S., Liu, N. (Eds.) (2014). Handbook on Heritage, Community, and Native American Language Education in the United States: Research, Policy and Practice. London: Routledge.
 Borman, K., Wiley, T.G., Danzig, A., & García, D. (Co-Editors) (2014), Review of Research in Education, 38(1) (an American Educational Research Association, AERA, publication). 
 Wiley, T.G., Lee, J.S., Rumberger, R. (Eds.) (2009). The Education of Language Minority Immigrants in the United States. Bristol, UK: Multilingual Matters, LTD.
 Wiley, T.G. (2005). Literacy and Language Diversity in the United States, Second Edition. Washington, DC & McHenry, IL: Center for Applied Linguistics & Delta Systems.
 Ramírez, J.D., Wiley, T.G., de Klerk, G. & Lee, E., & Wright, W. (Eds.) (2005). Ebonics in the Urban Education Debate, 2nd Edition. Clevedon, UK: Multilingual Matters, LTD.
 Wiley, T.G. (1996). Literacy and Language Diversity in the United States. Washington, DC & McHenry, IL: Center for Applied Linguistics & Delta Systems.

References 

Year of birth missing (living people)
Living people
University of Maryland, College Park faculty
Arizona State University faculty
California State University, Long Beach alumni
University of Southern California alumni
People from San Pedro, Los Angeles